Elachista granosa is a moth of the family Elachistidae that is found in Utah.

The basal 1/5 of the costa of the forewings is brownish grey. The ground colour is white, irregularly powdered with dark brown tips of scales forming very indistinct streaks in the middle of the wing at the fold and at 2/3 of the wing. The hindwings are translucent and light grey and the underside of the wings is light brownish grey.

Etymology
The species name is derived from Latin granum (meaning grain).

References

Moths described in 1997
granosa
Endemic fauna of Utah
Moths of North America